Harry W. Smith (February 5, 1856 in North Vernon, Indiana – June 4, 1898 in Queensville, Indiana) was a professional baseball player who was an infielder in the Major Leagues from 1877 to 1889.  He played for the Chicago White Stockings, Cincinnati Reds, and Louisville Colonels.

External links

1856 births
1898 deaths
Major League Baseball infielders
Chicago White Stockings players
Cincinnati Reds (1876–1879) players
Louisville Colonels players
19th-century baseball players
Grand Rapids (minor league baseball) players
Saginaw Greys players
Birmingham (minor league baseball) players
Topeka Capitals players
People from North Vernon, Indiana